Henry Delactnack Debosnys (May 16, 1836 – April 27, 1883) was a man who was hanged for murder of his third wife, Elizabeth Wells.

Debosnys' true identity was never determined. According to his autobiography, he was born in Lisbon, Portugal. He spoke six languages and said he had been married twice before. He arrived in Essex on a yacht with a woman he claimed was his wife. She disappeared and a few weeks later he married Betsy Wells on June 8, 1882. She was a local widow with four daughters who owned a small farm in Essex, New York which she had inherited from her first husband, along with a sum of money from. He was arrested August 1st, 1882 in Essex, New York after local farmers had seen him acting suspiciously in the woods and returned to the location later and found the body of Betsy Wells. His trial was on March 6, 1883, took two days and the jury deliberated for eight minutes before returning a verdict of guilty of murder in the first degree. 

He was hanged on April 27, 1883, the second and last person to be hanged in Essex County. The execution was watched by approximately 2000 people. Debosnys' last words, as reported by the hangman, were "I am innocent of the crime. You have made a mistake. The blood on my knife was the blood of a chipmunk." He had sold his body in advance to a local doctor for $15 and it was found to be covered in tattoos which were never specifically described. His skull and the noose he was hanged with are on display in the Adirondack History Center Museum in Elizabethtown, New York.

Debosnys left enciphered documents, that have never been decrypted, using a cryptographic script (or scripts) and/or pictograms.

References

External links
 Cheri L. Farnsworth: Adirondack Enigma. 2011, 

1836 births
1883 deaths
American people executed for murder
People executed by New York (state) by hanging
Portuguese emigrants to the United States
Undeciphered historical codes and ciphers
Unidentified American criminals
Unidentified people